This article is about the particular significance of the year 1853 to Wales and its people.

Incumbents

Lord Lieutenant of Anglesey – Henry Paget, 1st Marquess of Anglesey 
Lord Lieutenant of Brecknockshire – John Lloyd Vaughan Watkins
Lord Lieutenant of Caernarvonshire – Sir Richard Williams-Bulkeley, 10th Baronet 
Lord Lieutenant of Cardiganshire – William Edward Powell
Lord Lieutenant of Carmarthenshire – John Campbell, 1st Earl Cawdor 
Lord Lieutenant of Denbighshire – Robert Myddelton Biddulph   
Lord Lieutenant of Flintshire – Sir Stephen Glynne, 9th Baronet
Lord Lieutenant of Glamorgan – Christopher Rice Mansel Talbot (from 4 May)
Lord Lieutenant of Merionethshire – Edward Lloyd-Mostyn, 2nd Baron Mostyn
Lord Lieutenant of Monmouthshire – Capel Hanbury Leigh
Lord Lieutenant of Montgomeryshire – Charles Hanbury-Tracy, 1st Baron Sudeley
Lord Lieutenant of Pembrokeshire – Sir John Owen, 1st Baronet
Lord Lieutenant of Radnorshire – John Walsh, 1st Baron Ormathwaite
Bishop of Bangor – Christopher Bethell 
Bishop of Llandaff – Alfred Ollivant 
Bishop of St Asaph – Thomas Vowler Short 
Bishop of St Davids – Connop Thirlwall

Events
23 January — Six members of the Rhyl lifeboat crew are drowned when the boat overturns.
11 November — Approval is given for the opening of the Vale of Neath Railway line from Gelli Tarw to Merthyr Tydfil, which had been postponed on safety grounds.
date unknown
David Williams (Alaw Goch) opens a new colliery at Cwmdare.
Blaenavon Ironworks adopts the hot blast process.
John Williams (Ab Ithel) quarrels with his friend and co-editor Harry Longueville Jones and resigns the editorship of Archaeologia Cambrensis.
Two Welsh translations of Uncle Tom's Cabin are published: Caban F'Ewyrth Twm by Hugh Williams (Cadfan) and (an abridged version) Crynodeb o Gaban ‘Newyrth Tom by (probably) Thomas Levi (or William Williams) under the pen-name Y Lefiad.
William Roberts (Nefydd) is appointed South Wales agent for the British and Foreign Schools Society.
Hugh Owen becomes Chief Clerk of the Poor Law Commission.
Robert Fulke Greville the younger returns to his family estate at Milford Haven.

Arts and literature

Awards
William Thomas (Islwyn) wins his first major eisteddfod prize at Cefn-Coed-y-Cymer.

New books
B. B. Woodward — The History of Wales 
W. Downing Evans — The Gwyddonwyson Wreath
John Mills (Ieuan Glan Alarch) — British Jews
Richard Williams Morgan — Raymonde de Monthault, The Lord Marcher
Thomas Rowland — Welsh Grammar
William Spurrell — English-Welsh Dictionary
Isaac Williams — Sermons on the Epistles and Gospels for the Sundays and Holy Days
Benjamin Thomas Williams — Desirableness of a University for Wales

Music
Robert James (Jeduthyn) marries the sister of fellow musician Joseph Parry.

Visual arts
John Evan Thomas — John, Marquis of Bute (bronze casting, Cardiff)

Births
31 March — John Roberts, missionary (d. 1949 in Wales)
20 May — John Owen Williams, Congregational minister, poet and Archdruid (died 1932)
20 August — Charles Lewis, rugby player (d. 1923)
26 September — Godfrey Darbishire, Wales rugby international player (d. 1889)
5 October — Garrod Thomas, physician, philanthropist, magistrate, politician (d. 1889)

Deaths
23 January — Sir Love Jones-Parry, army officer and politician, 71
27 January — John Iltyd Nicholl, MP and judge, 55
18 February — Richard Jones, preacher, 72/73
6 April — John Jones, Anglican priest, scholar and literary patron, 70
24 April — Thomas Prothero, coal-owner, 73
17 November — Henry Somerset, 7th Duke of Beaufort, 61
18 November — David Bowen, Felinfoel, Baptist minister, 78

References

 
Wales